Cranworth is a village and civil parish in the Breckland district of the English county of Norfolk.

History
Cranworth's name is of Anglo-Saxon origin and derives from the Old English for an enclosed part of land with cranes and herons.

In the Domesday Book, Cranworth is recorded as a settlement of 42 households located in the hundred of Mitford. In 1086, the village formed part of the estates of King William.

Geography
According to the 2011 Census, Cranworth has a population of 419 residents living in 175 households.

Cranworth falls within the constituency of South West Norfolk and is represented at Parliament by Liz Truss MP of the Conservative Party.

St. Mary's Church
Cranworth's parish church is of Norman origin and is dedicated to Saint Mary. The interior of the church is almost exclusively Victorian and the font dates from the Fourteenth Century.

Notable residents
 Robert Rolfe, 1st Baron Cranworth- British lawyer and politician

War memorial
Cranworth's war memorial takes the form of a cuboid stone column topped with a stone carving of an angel of victory. The memorial is located in St. Mary's Churchyard and lists the following names for the First World War:
 Lance-Corporal Robert R. Tuttle (1892-1916), 1st Battalion, Royal Norfolk Regiment
 Driver William F. Lyon (1894-1919), Royal Army Service Corps att. 4th Cavalry Division
 Private Victor T. Edwards (d.1916), 8th Battalion, Border Regiment
 Private Ernest W. Graves (1880-1918), 6th Battalion, Royal East Kent Regiment
 Private Frederick J. Green (1899-1918), 61st Battalion, Machine Gun Corps
 Private John Hagan (d.1916), 2nd Battalion, Royal Norfolk Regiment
 Private Lionel W. Green (1897-1917), 1/5th Battalion, Royal Norfolk Regiment
 Private Sidney Hipkin (d.1918), 9th Battalion, Royal Norfolk Regiment
 Private Bartlett J. Hart (1894-1917), 1st Battalion, Queen's Royal Regiment
 Private Frederick C. Ward (d.1918), 1st Battalion, Queen's Royal Regiment
 Johnathan Berry
 Frederic S. Sidell

And, the following for the Second World War:
 Able-Seaman Geoffrey G. Ebbage (1923-1941), HMS Calcutta
 Private George Graves (1920-1940), 2nd Battalion, Durham Light Infantry
 Albert Clarke
 Robert Harris

References

External links

Villages in Norfolk
Civil parishes in Norfolk
Breckland District